Casey Laing Lockwood (born 5 November 1985) is an American New Zealand professional basketball player.

Career

College
From 2003 to 2007, Lockwood had her college career at the Ivy League college, Princeton University in Princeton, New Jersey for the Tigers.

Princeton statistics

Source

New Zealand
After moving to Stewart Island in south New Zealand, Lockwood began competing in a smaller competition with the Southland Pearls. In 2011, Lockwood was called up to compete in the WBC with the Otago-based Oceana Gold Rush. In her debut season, she would help the Gold Rush take home the WBC title as well as being named to the WBC First Team and being awarded tournament MVP.

Australia
In 2011, Lockwood was signed by the Townsville Fire in the Women's National Basketball League. She was re-signed for the 2012–13 season. Lockwood then travelled west, signing with the Joondalup Wolves of Western Australia's State Basketball League. In her first season, she helped the Wolves take home the team's fourth championship title. She would remain with the Wolves for three seasons.

National team
Born and raised in California, United States, Lockwood would then move to New Zealand in 2009. After gaining permanent residency, Lockwood looked to represent New Zealand, as a naturalised player. After obtaining citizenship with help from Basketball New Zealand, Lockwood made her debut for the Tall Ferns at the 2012 FIBA Olympic Qualifying Tournament in Ankara, Turkey. She would then take home a silver medal at the 2013 FIBA Oceania Championship.

References

1985 births
Forwards (basketball)
New Zealand women's basketball players
American women's basketball players
American emigrants to New Zealand
Townsville Fire players
Princeton Tigers women's basketball players
Living people